'Tuula' is a Swedish humor comic strip by the cartoonist Arja Kajermo.

The strip's main characters are Tuula, a Finnish immigrant working as a nurse, and her partner Seppo.

The strip is published every Sunday in the Swedish daily Dagens Nyheter.

External links
 Tuula.se - official website

Swedish comic strips